Jill Hetherington and Elna Reinach were the defending champions but only Hetherington competed that year with Kristine Radford.

Hetherington and Radford lost in the final 6–1, 6–0 against Els Callens and Julie Halard-Decugis.

Seeds
Champion seeds are indicated in bold text while text in italics indicates the round in which those seeds were eliminated.

 Irina Spîrlea /  Linda Wild (first round)
 Patricia Tarabini /  Caroline Vis (first round)
 Jill Hetherington /  Kristine Radford (final)
 Els Callens /  Julie Halard-Decugis (champions)

Draw

External links
 ITF tournament edition details

WTA Auckland Open
1996 WTA Tour